Olga Sober (Šober) (born in Sarajevo) is an opera singer and leading soprano in the Croatian National Theatre in Rijeka.

Career
Olga Šober graduated from the Zagreb Academy of Music and the University of Music and Performing Arts, Vienna, where she specialized in "Lied und Oratorium". She acquired her MA at the Musical Arts College in Belgrade. She worked as leading soprano of Croatian National Theatre in Osijek and since 1988 has been a leading soprano with the Croatian National Theatre "Ivan pl. Zajc" Rijeka. She has performed as a guest artist in Croatia, Yugoslavia, Italy, Hungary, Ukraine, Russia, Luxembourg, Japan, Germany, Austria, Bulgaria and Taiwan.  She has sung with the leading conductors including Lovro von Matačić, Kazushi Ono, Vjekoslav Šutej, and Weikart.

Olga Šober is also involved in concert activities as a solo singer collaborating with numerous ensembles (Collegium pro Musica Sacra, Collegium Musicum Fluminense, Oratory Choir of the City of Rijeka, "Ivan Goran Kovačić" Choir...). She recorded several sound carriers as well as videotapes of the operas “L'elisir d’amore”, “Nikola Šubić Zrinjski” and “Rigoletto”.

She has played several roles including Gilda in Verdi's "Rigoletto", Violette in “La Traviata”, Lucia di Lammermoore in homonymous Donizetti's opera, Jelena in “Nikola Šubić Zrinjski” by Ivan Zajc, Margarita in “Faust”, Michaela in “Carmen”.

Prizes and awards 
 "The Pavao Markovac", the best student Dean's award
 "Darko Lukić", award of music critics from daily newspaper Vijesnik
 "Shalijapin’s Medal" at the All-Russian Festival in Kazan (Tatar Republic)
 Annual Award of City of Rijeka for 1994
 "Milka Trnina’s award", award of Croatian Theatre for 1997
 Croatian Presidential medal of merit for the achievements in Croatian culture in 1998.

Sources
Croatian National Theatre (Rijeka), Artist's biography: Olga Šober. See also La traviata, 2008/2009 season; Pčelica Maja, 2008/2009 season; Signor Bruschino 2005/2006 season
City of Stange, Operettekveld med Bojan og Olga Sober, 6 September 2007 (in Norwegian)

External links
Official website

Year of birth missing (living people)
Living people
Croatian operatic sopranos
Musicians from Sarajevo
Academy of Music, University of Zagreb alumni
University of Music and Performing Arts Vienna alumni
20th-century Croatian women opera singers
21st-century Croatian women opera singers